Paul Todd may refer to:

Paul Todd (footballer) (1920–2000), English footballer and manager
Paul H. Todd Jr. (1921–2008), American politician
Paul Todd (cricketer) (born 1953), English cricketer
Paul Todd (musician), guitarist with Iron Maiden in 1979